Jérémy Bruno Guillemenot (born 6 January 1998) is a Swiss professional footballer who plays as a forward for FC St. Gallen.

References

External links

Living people
1998 births
Swiss men's footballers
Footballers from Geneva
Association football forwards
Switzerland under-21 international footballers
Switzerland youth international footballers
Swiss Super League players
Swiss Challenge League players
Segunda División B players
Austrian Football Bundesliga players
Servette FC players
FC Barcelona Atlètic players
CE Sabadell FC footballers
SK Rapid Wien players
FC St. Gallen players
Swiss expatriate footballers
Swiss expatriate sportspeople in Spain
Expatriate footballers in Spain
Swiss expatriate sportspeople in Austria
Expatriate footballers in Austria